Leptocroca vinaria is a moth of the family Oecophoridae. It was described by Edward Meyrick in 1914. It is found in New Zealand.

References

 "Leptocroca vinaria (Meyrick, 1914)". New Zealand Organisms Register. Retrieved 6 September 2020.

Moths described in 1914
Oecophoridae
Endemic fauna of New Zealand
Taxa named by Edward Meyrick
Moths of New Zealand
Endemic moths of New Zealand